House of Councillors elections were held in Japan on 1 July 1962, electing half the seats in the House. The Liberal Democratic Party won the most seats. This was the first Japanese national election to feature the Kōmeitō as a candidate, as it had formed earlier in the same year.

As is typical for House of Councillors elections, candidate personality and public appeal played a stronger role than they would in a House of Representatives election; the first place winner for the national district voting was Aki Fujiwara, a panelist on the Japanese version of I've Got a Secret, who broke all of the previous House of Councillors records by obtaining 1,160,000 votes.

The Japan Socialist Party (JSP) had attempted to make questions of constitutional revision the main issue for the election, whereas the LDP attempted to sideline the issue by claiming that it would not pursue any constitutional amendments unless it were to receive recommendations from the Constitutional Investigation Commission, which was still in the process of deliberating at the time of the election. Overall, the JSP lost the most in this election, losing 19 seats, whereas the LDP gained 10 seats.

Results

By constituency

References

Japan
House of Councillors (Japan) elections
1962 elections in Japan
July 1962 events in Asia
Election and referendum articles with incomplete results